Sky Express is a Greek domestic airline with its hub at Heraklion International Airport.

References

Lists of airline destinations